Rothenburgsort is a station on the Berlin-Hamburg railway line and served by the trains of Hamburg S-Bahn lines S2 and S21. The station was opened in 1907 and is located in the Hamburg district of Rothenburgsort, Germany. Rothenburgsort is part of the borough of Hamburg-Mitte.

History  
The station was opened in 1907 to serve the commuter rail in Hamburg's south-eastern quarters.
From 1915 until 1943, the station was also called by trains of the Hamburger Hochbahn with its tracks and platform located directly to the north of the S-Bahn premises. In 1958 Rothenburgsort station was electrified and integrated into the Hamburg S-Bahn network.

Station layout 
Rothenburgsort station is located on the eastern side of Billhorner Deich, the elevated rail tracks cross the street on an iron bridge. The only entrance to the one island platform is located at this bridge. The station is going to be reconstructed until December 2022, including new bridges over Billhorner Deich. The historical charm will be refurbished, but be brought to the 21st century, including an elevator and a convenience store on platform.

Service 
The lines S2 and S21 of Hamburg S-Bahn call at Rothenburgsort station.

Gallery

See also  

 Hamburger Verkehrsverbund (HVV)
 List of Hamburg S-Bahn stations

References

External links 

 Line and route network plans at hvv.de 

Hamburg S-Bahn stations in Hamburg
Buildings and structures in Hamburg-Mitte
Railway stations in Germany opened in 1907